Red Condor, Inc. is a privately held company that offers anti-spam appliances and a hosted service that block e-mail spam, spyware, and viruses. The company also offers a message archiving service that provides back-up of inbound and outbound email messages.

In 2007, Red Condor introduced Vx Technology, which integrates a local appliance with a Hosted Service. The technology redirects email from the appliance to the Hosted Service in the event of network failure.

In November 2008, the company named Dr. Thomas Steding, former CEO of PGP Corporation, as president and CEO.

In January 2009, Red Condor received Technology of the Year award from InfoWorld magazine.

In April 2010, Red Condor was purchased by St. Bernard Software.

Products
 Message Assurance Gateway Appliances
 Message Assurance Gateway Hosted Service
 Red Condor Archive

References

External links
EdgeWave home page
Red Condor Threat Center

Software companies established in 2003
Networking companies of the United States
Spam filtering
Anti-spam
Companies based in Sonoma County, California